This article lists events that occurred during 1948 in Estonia.

Incumbents
Nikolai Karotamm  – First Secretary of the Communist Party of Estonia

Events
Newspaper Edasi was found.
March – Massive formation of kolkhozes begins.
25 March – second deportation. Over 20,500 people are sent to Siberia.

Births
2 October – Siim Kallas, Estonian politician

Deaths

References

 
1940s in Estonia
Estonia
Estonia
Years of the 20th century in Estonia